Gigliola (Gigi) Zanchetta Pirella (born April 3, 1966) is a Venezuelan actress.

Life and career
Zanchetta has made her television debut in the telenovela Cristal; she later specialized in the genre, appearing in over 20 telenovelas, among them Primavera alongside Fernando Carrillo and Cara Sucia.  In the mid-1990s she has sparked controversy for being the first Venezuelan celebrity to pose nude for a magazine, appearing in the cover of the Spanish magazine Interviú. She was also active in films and in theatre. Her last telenovela role was in 2012; since then she moved to Spain with her son, leaving the entertainment industry. A former backer of Chavismo and of Nicolás Maduro, she eventually publicly regretted about her support to him and attacked him on various occasions.

Telenovelas

 Cristal (1985)
 Más allá del silencio (1985)
 El Seductor (1986)
 Mansión de luxe (1986)
 La dama de rosa (1986)
 Primavera (1988)
 Alondra (1989)
 El Engaño (1989)
 Inolvidable (1992)
 Cara sucia (1992)
 Dulce enemiga (1995)
 Pecado de amor (1996)
 Contra viento y marea (1997)
 El País de las mujeres (1998)
 Enséñame a querer (1998)
 Toda mujer (1999)
 Hechizo de amor (2000)
 Más que amor, frenesí (2001)
 Mambo y canela (2002)
 Las González (2002)
 Engañada (2003)
 Sabor a ti (2004)
 Los Querendones (2006)
 Te tengo en salsa (2006)
 Natalia del mar (2011)
 Válgame Dios (2012)

References

External links

1966 births
Venezuelan television actresses
Venezuelan people of Italian descent
Living people
Venezuelan telenovela actresses